Volana is a genus of moths in the subfamily Lymantriinae. The genus was erected by Paul Griveaud in 1976.

Species
Some species of this genus are:

Volana cyclota (Collenette, 1959)
Volana flavescens Griveaud, 1977
Volana lakato Griveaud, 1977
Volana lichenodes (Collenette, 1936)
Volana masoala Griveaud, 1977
Volana mniara (Collenette, 1936)
Volana perineti Griveaud, 1977
Volana phloeodes (Collenette, 1936)

References

Lymantriinae